The men's 10 metre platform diving competition at the 2002 Asian Games in Busan was held on 13 October at the Sajik Swimming Pool.

Schedule
All times are Korea Standard Time (UTC+09:00)

Results

Semifinal

Final

References 

2002 Asian Games Official Report, Pages 237–238
Results

Diving at the 2002 Asian Games